These are the squads for the 2003 CONCACAF Gold Cup.

Group A

Brazil
Head coach:  Ricardo Gomes

Honduras
Head coach:  Edwin Pavón

Mexico
Head coach:  Ricardo La Volpe

Group B

Colombia
Head coach:  Francisco Maturana

Guatemala
Head coach:  Víctor Manuel Aguado

Jamaica
Head coach:  Carl Brown

Group C

El Salvador
Head coach:  Juan Ramón Paredes

Martinique
Head coach:  Théodore Antonin

United States
Head coach:  Bruce Arena

Group D

Canada
Head coach:  Holger Osieck

Costa Rica
Head coach:  Steve Sampson

Cuba
Head coach:  Miguel Company

External links
CONCACAF
SportsIllustrated 

CONCACAF Gold Cup squads
Players